Warburton may refer to

Places

Australia 

 Warburton, Queensland, a locality in the Shire of Boulia
Warburton River, South Australia
East Warburton Basin, the site of a large impact crater
Warburton, Victoria
Lilydale to Warburton Rail Trail
Warburton East, Victoria
Warburton Highway
Warburton Hospital
Warburton railway line
Warburton railway station
Warburton, Western Australia
Warburton Airport

Canada 

 Mount Warburton Pike, British Columbia, Canada

South Africa 

 Warburton, Mpumalanga, South Africa

Pakistan 

 Warburton, Punjab, Pakistan

United Kingdom 

Warburton, Greater Manchester, in England
Bent Farmhouse, Warburton
Church House, Warburton
Heatley & Warburton railway station
St Werburgh's Church, Warburton
Warburton School
Warburton's Wood Nature Reserve, Kingsley, Cheshire, England

United States 

 Fort Warburton, 1809-built fort protecting Washington D.C.

Other places 

Warburton Peak, South Georgia
Warburton Ledge, Antarctica

People
 Warburton (name), including a list of people with the name
 Melissa Warburton, a character in the TV series Friends

Other
 Warburton Lectures, series of theology lectures held in Lincoln’s Inn, London
 Warburtons, bakers established in 1876
 Warburtons Milk Roll-A-Coaster, roller coaster in Blackpool, England
 Will Warburton, novel by George Gissing
 Warburton House, a historic hotel located in Philadelphia, Pennsylvania, United States